Lucius (McEdward) O'Brien, 13th Baron Inchiquin (5 December 1800 – 22 March 1872), known as Sir Lucius O'Brien, 5th Baronet from 1837 to 1855, was an Irish politician and nobleman. He is remembered respectfully in County Clare for his relief work in the famine years.

Biography
He was born at Dromoland Castle in 1800, the eldest son of Sir Edward O'Brien, 4th Baronet and Charlotte Smith. He was educated at Trinity College, Cambridge, graduating B.A. in 1825. In 1826, he replaced his father as Tory Member of Parliament for Clare, but was unseated in 1830 by the Whig candidates. He unsuccessfully contested the county again in 1835, but was appointed High Sheriff of Clare for that year instead. Upon the death of his father in 1837, he succeeded to the baronetcy, and he was appointed Lord Lieutenant of Clare in 1843.

He again contested Clare in 1847, topping the poll and ousting Cornelius O'Brien. In 1848, he published a book, Ireland in 1848: the late famine and the Poor Laws. During the same year, his brother William Smith O'Brien, a Liberal, led an abortive rebellion and narrowly escaped hanging. O'Brien did not contest Clare in 1852.

In 1855, he inherited the title of Baron Inchiquin from his ninth cousin, the last Marquess of Thomond, and was confirmed in this right by the Lord's Committee of Privileges in 1862. He was elected a representative peer for Ireland in 1863. He died in 1872 at Dromoland and was succeeded by his son Edward O'Brien, 14th Baron Inchiquin.

Family
O'Brien married Mary, daughter of William FitzGerald of Adelphi and Corofin, and together they had the following children;
Edward O'Brien, 14th Baron Inchiquin
Charlotte O'Brien
Mary Grace O'Brien.

Notes

References

 The Parliaments of England by Henry Stooks Smith (1st edition published in three volumes 1844-50), second edition edited (in one volume) by F.W.S. Craig (Political Reference Publications 1973)) out of copyright

Further reading

External links 
 

1800 births
1872 deaths
19th-century Irish politicians
Politicians from County Clare
Alumni of Trinity College, Cambridge
O'Brien, Lucius, 5th Baronet
Irish representative peers
Lord-Lieutenants of Clare
O'Brien, Lucius, 5th Baronet
People educated at Harrow School
Tory MPs (pre-1834)
O'Brien, Lucius
O'Brien, Lucius, 5th Baronet
UK MPs who inherited peerages
Lucius
High Sheriffs of Clare
Barons Inchiquin
Irish chiefs of the name